GNV Spirit is a cruiseferry owned by GNV (Grandi Navi Veloci) and operated by GNV between Tyrrhenian Sea & Spain. She was acquired in 2022 by Grandi Navi Veloci from Brittany Ferries for an undisclosed amount.

SECA 2015 refit
On 1 January 2015, the EU (including the North Sea, English Channel, Eastern side of the Western Channel and Baltic Sea) had a sulphur in marine fuel cut from the allowance in 2014 of 1% to 0.1% of sulphur allowed, Brittany Ferries then abundantly announced in January 2014 that they were going to fit scrubbers to a number of elder vessels, convert newer vessels to LNG and construct a new LNG powered ferry but Brittany Ferries later withdrew and cancelled the order and the LNG conversions, instead they announced that all vessels were to have scrubbers systems fitted.

Normandie was the first vessel in the fleet to have these installed at the Astillero shipyard in Santander in late 2014 re-entering service in January 2015. Cap Finistère sailed from Portsmouth to Santander on 11 January 2015 with a commercial sailing, before proceeding to the shipyard for refit and installation of scrubber technology which will also necessitate a new funnel arrangement. After the re-entry into service of Cap Finistère on 24 March 2015 with the 10:30 sailing from Bilbao (Zierbena) to Portsmouth, she will be followed into the shipyard by Barfleur in March returning to service in May 2015.

Brief history
Superfast V was built at HDW in Kiel for Superfast Ferries' Adriatic Sea services, Patras—Igoumenitsa-Ancona along with her sister ship Superfast VI. She was the first ship in the third pair of ropax ferries built for Superfast Ferries from various ship yards in Northern Europe. She was ordered in July 1998, alongside sister ship  and another pair for Baltic sea services, Superfast VII and VIII In March 2010 Brittany Ferries purchased the ship from Attica Group for €82 million to expand Spanish services.

MV Cap Finistère was delivered to Brittany Ferries under her new name in February 2010. During October 2010 she conducted berthing trials in Cherbourg and Portsmouth before heading for work to be completed in Dunkerque prior to entering service running Portsmouth to Cherbourg as her first route eventually running a Portsmouth to Bilbao route with occasional stops to Roscoff Santander and Plymouth.

In early 2022, GNV brought the 'Cap Finistère' from Brittany Ferries for an undisclosed amount. The vessel was renamed "GNV Spirit" and now serves in the Mediterranean.

Current Routes
GNV Spirit currently operates the current routes.
 Barcelona <> Palma de Mallorca 
 Valenica <> Palma de Mallorca

Routes for Brittany Ferries

 Portsmouth <> Bilbao (Via Roscoff)
 Portsmouth <> Santander
 Portsmouth <> Cherbourg-Octeville

References

External links
 Official Brittany Ferries Website

Ferries of the United Kingdom
Ferries of France
Ships built in Kiel
2000 ships
05
2022 mergers and acquisitions